Olav Klepp (born 13 July 1962) is a Norwegian footballer. He played in one match for the Norway national football team in 1987.

References

External links
 

1962 births
Living people
Norwegian footballers
Norway international footballers
Place of birth missing (living people)
Association footballers not categorized by position